Leptobrachium buchardi is a species of amphibian in the family Megophryidae.
It is endemic to Laos and only known from the Bolaven Plateau in the Champasak Province, near its type locality within the Dong Hua Sao National Protected Area.
Its natural habitat is subtropical or tropical moist montane forests.
It is threatened by habitat loss.

Male Leptobrachium buchardi measure  and female  in snout–vent length.

References

buchardi
Endemic fauna of Laos
Amphibians of Laos
Taxonomy articles created by Polbot
Amphibians described in 2004